Encore is a 1996 French comedy-drama film written and directed by Pascal Bonitzer. The film stars Jackie Berroyer, Valeria Bruni Tedeschi, Laurence Côte, Natacha Régnier, and Hélène Fillières.

Synopsis
The film follows the mid-life crisis of a university professor.

Cast
 Jackie Berroyer as Abel Vichac
 Valeria Bruni Tedeschi as Aliette
 Natacha Régnier as Catherine
 Hélène Fillières as Aurore
 Laurence Côte as Florence
 Michel Massé as Thomas
 Louis-Do de Lencquesaing as Bruno
 Fabrice Desplechin as Henri
 Meï Zhou as Lin Tong
 Eva Ionesco as Olga
 Pascal Bonitzer as Bergère
 Lou Castel as Le Vendeur du métro

Awards and nominations
Bonitzer was awarded the 1996 Prix Jean Vigo for Encore. The film also earned him a César Award nomination for Best First Feature Film. Régnier was nominated for the 1997 Acteurs à l'Écran Best Actress award for her performance in the film.

References

External links
 

1996 comedy-drama films
1996 films
1990s French-language films
Films directed by Pascal Bonitzer
French comedy-drama films
Midlife crisis films
1996 directorial debut films
1990s French films